WJJX (102.7 MHz) is a commercial FM radio station licensed to Appomattox, Virginia, and serving the Lynchburg metropolitan area and the Southside.  WJJX has a rhythmic Top 40 radio format and is owned and operated by iHeartMedia, Inc. Programming is simulcast with co-owned 93.5 WJJS in Salem, Virginia, serving the Roanoke metropolitan area.  The radio studios and offices are on Old Forest Road in Lynchburg and its transmitter is off Round Mountain Road in Madison Heights, Virginia.

Most shows on WJJX and WJJS are either syndicated or voicetracked.  Syndicated shows include Elvis Duran and the Morning Show, On Air with Ryan Seacrest in middays and The Tino Cochino Radio Show heard evenings.

References

External links
JJS Online

1989 establishments in Virginia
Contemporary hit radio stations in the United States
Radio stations established in 1989
JJX
IHeartMedia radio stations